Anbar Sara (also Romanized as ‘Anbar Sarā and Anbār Sarā; also known as ‘Ambar Sarāi and ‘Anbar Sara’ī) is a village in Zaveh Rural District, in the Central District of Zaveh County, Razavi Khorasan Province, Iran. At the 2006 census, its population was 815, in 170 families.

See also 

 List of cities, towns and villages in Razavi Khorasan Province

References 

Populated places in Zaveh County